Suurpea is a village in Kuusalu Parish in Harju County in northern Estonia.  The village  has a population of 163 (as of 1 January 2009). It is situated on the western coast of the Pärispea Peninsula.

References

Villages in Harju County